The Alexandria Lakes AVA is an American Viticultural Area located in Douglas County, Minnesota, near the city of Alexandria.  Alexandria Lakes was the first AVA to be created in Minnesota.  The AVA was created in 2005 as the result of a successful petition to the United States Department of the Treasury Alcohol and Tobacco Tax and Trade Bureau by the owners of Carlos Creek Winery, a winery near the city of Alexandria in the state of Minnesota.

References 

American Viticultural Areas
Geography of Douglas County, Minnesota
Minnesota wine
2005 establishments in Minnesota